"I Only Want to Be with You" is a song written by Mike Hawker and Ivor Raymonde. The debut solo single released by British singer Dusty Springfield under her long-time producer Johnny Franz, "I Only Want to Be with You" peaked at number 4 on the UK Singles chart in January 1964. Three remakes of the song have been UK chart hits, the first two by the Bay City Rollers (1976) and The Tourists (1979) matching the number 4 peak of the Dusty Springfield original, while the 1989 remake by Samantha Fox peaked at number 16. In the US on the Billboard Hot 100 chart, "I Only Want to Be with You" has been a Top 40 hit three times, with both the Dusty Springfield original and the Bay City Rollers' remake peaking at number 12 while the Samantha Fox remake peaked at number 31. "I Only Want to Be with You" has also been recorded by a wide range of artists, several of whom sing the song with lyrics translated from the original English.

Versions
Of this song, more than a hundred versions have been made, in different languages (English, French, Spanish, Portuguese, Japanese, etc.).

Dusty Springfield version

Background 
According to Jean Ryder, the ex-wife of songwriter Mike Hawker, "I Only Want to Be With You" was written soon after she and Hawker married on 1 December 1961, being inspired by Hawker's intense romantic feelings for his new bride. Ryder, who would later be a member of the Breakaways, had been a member of a vocal chorale, the Vernons Girls. Reportedly, she and Hawker had intended that she herself would record "I Only Want to Be With You". However, no formal arrangement for this eventuality had apparently been made by the autumn of 1963, when Hawker received a phone call from Philips A&R director Johnny Franz. Ryder paraphrases Franz as saying "Look we need something which is going to put this girl into the charts, because everybody is knocking her, everybody is saying she'll never make it [solo] – have you got a song that's a guaranteed hit?" Springfield had already recorded nine solo tracks, none of which was deemed the right vehicle to launch her solo career. With Ryder's permission, Hawker submitted "I Only Want to Be With You" to Franz, having made a demo featuring Ryder singing while keeping the beat by tapping on a biscuit tin lid. Franz, and then Springfield, approved the song, which Springfield recorded in a 25 October 1963 session at Olympic Studios, arranged and conducted by Ivor Raymonde, and recorded by engineer Keith Grant. Jean Ryder was included in the vocal chorale on the session. For unknown reasons, a version with Springfield's unadulterated vocals was rejected. The song was produced using the Wall of Sound production method first conceived by Phil Spector, while the various instrumental features in the arrangement such as backup singers, double-tracked vocals, and a horn section were inspired by groups such as the Shirelles.

Released in November 1963, three weeks after the Springfields' final concert, "I Only Want to Be With You" was a global success, reaching number 4 UK, number 12 US, number 6 Australia, and number 21 Canada.  In the US, Dusty Springfield was the second artist of the British Invasion, after the Beatles, to have a hit, entering the Billboard chart at number 77 in the last week of January 1964 (the Beatles having "She Loves You" at number 69 and "I Want to Hold Your Hand" at number 3).

Raymonde's arrangement is unmistakable, with its relentless "ticker-ticker" beat and cascading drum rolls, full-on choirs and "Tower of Power" horn section pitched against soaring rock strings. It set the production standard for Springfield's later hits, such as "Stay Awhile" and "Little by Little". Springfield also recorded the song with an almost identical arrangement in German, with the title "Auf dich nur wart' ich immerzu".

The song was performed by Springfield on the first-ever edition of the BBC's Top of the Pops, on 1 January 1964.

Springfield's version was re-released in 1988, coinciding with its use in a soft-drink commercial, as a 7" & 12" single (see cover in infobox), peaking at number 83 in the UK.

Springfield's "I Only Want to Be with You" served as the theme song for the HBO sitcom Arliss, from 1997 to 2002 (replacing "I Can't Help Myself (Sugar Pie Honey Bunch)" by the Four Tops which was the series' theme in its inaugural 1996 season).

Charts

Certifications

Bay City Rollers version

Background
The Bay City Rollers recorded "I Only Want to Be with You" for their 1976 album Dedication in June and July 1976 at Soundstage Studio in Toronto with producer Jimmy Ienner. Dedication was the first Bay City Rollers recorded under the auspices of Arista Records, and it was Arista president Clive Davis who suggested that the group remake "I Only Want to Be with You." Jimmy Ienner was chosen by Davis to produce the Bay City Rollers on the basis of Ienner's work with the Raspberries.

In the US "I Only Want to Be with You" was issued as advance single from Dedication in August 1976: that October the track reached a Billboard Hot 100 peak of number 12, besting the number 28 peak of the precedent Bay City Rollers' single "Rock and Roll Love Letter" while failing to match the Top Ten success the group had enjoyed in 1975–1976 with "Saturday Night" and in 1976 with "Money Honey". "I Only Want to Be with You" appeared to wrap up the group's burst of North American stardom as their next three US single releases were Top 40 shortfalls: however the group's fourth US single release subsequent to "I Only Want to Be With You": "You Made Me Believe in Magic", did afford the group a final Top Ten hit.

Issued in the UK as a non-album single on 3 September 1976, "I Only Wanna Be with You" – so entitled – reached number 4 UK, affording the Bay City Rollers' a tenth and final Top Ten hit.

It's noteworthy that the US and UK chart peaks of the Bay City Rollers' 1976 remake of "I Only Want to Be with You" exactly match the US and UK chart peaks achieved in 1964 by the Dusty Springfield original. However the Springfield original version had had a significantly stronger UK chart run holding at number 4 for 4 weeks – as opposed to the Bay City Rollers remake's one week chart peak – with the original's Top 50 tenure of 18 weeks being twice as long as the remake's. Conversely in the US the Bay City Rollers' remake had a Billboard Hot 100 tenure of 15 weeks while the Springfield original had maintained a Hot 100 presence for 10 weeks in total. (Comparisons between the chart impact of singles issued in distinct time periods should be considered imprecise, the methodology behind both the UK and US chart rankings having been frequently revised.)

Chicago radio superstation WLS, which gave the song much airplay, ranked "I Only Want to Be with You" as the 14th most popular hit of 1976.  It spent two weeks at number two on their survey of 6 November 1976.

Chart performance

Weekly charts

Year-end charts

The Tourists version

Background
In 1979, the song was also covered by The Tourists, a band which included Annie Lennox on vocals – which served as the band's biggest hit. The song was used on a montage of stars when Thames Television went off the air in December 1992.

Recording and reception 
The song was "put down in twenty minutes at the end of the album sessions", with Lennox recording the vocals in one take.

Lennox later said that "we were taken to the cleaners for doing that bloody song", as "the press absolutely slaughtered us". Dave Stewart said that "It was a bit out of proportion with 'I Only Want To Be With You' – the poppy side of it was really overplayed by everybody".

Reviewing the song for Record Mirror, Daniela Soave included it the singles of the week, writing that the song "definitely grows on you" and that "Lennox has the same deep mellow tones that Dusty Springfield displayed when she sang the same song, but it is saved from being a carbon-cover version by the instrumentation... handclaps, vicious guitar, chugging bass, that sort of thing.

Chart performance

Weekly charts

Year-end charts

Nicolette Larson version

Nicolette Larson remade "I Only Want to Be with You" for her album All Dressed Up and No Place to Go produced by Andrew Gold and recorded October 1981 – January 1982 at Sunset Sound. Released as a single in July 1982 – parallel with the album's release – Larson's version featured as B-side "How Can We Go On", a track from Larson's 1981 album Radioland which had been an unsuccessful 1981 A-side release.

Reviewing All Dressed Up and No Place to Go, High Fidelity critic Steven X. Rea cited "Dusty Springfield's 60s gem 'I Only Want to Be with You'" as one of several tracks which "Nicolette sings in an awkward warble, devoid of any emotional range". It drew similarly dismissive reaction from Tom Long of the Santa Cruz Sentinel, who rated the original 1963 hit a "swell oldie [that's an] ingratiating piece of fluff" and Larson's remake "awful [although] despite uninspired vocals and sheet musicianship [it] sounds good on the radio simply because the song itself sounds good and tickles forotten memory synapses". Bill Provick of the Ottawa Citizen who opined Larson gave "a rather lacklustre reading of [a] normally effervescent pop-rock classic." Tim Gebhart of the Rapid City Journal was more positive: "Larson['s] version remains true to the original but also contains her own special touch in the vocals."

Despite becoming Larson's fourth single to rank on the Hot 100 chart in Billboard magazine – and her first Hot 100 entry since 1980 – "I Only Want to Be with You" would prove a Top 40 shortfall, stalling at #53 in September 1983. Larson's label WB Records, electing not to issue a second single from All Dressed Up and No Place to Go, were motivated by the underperformance of that album and its one single to end Larson's label tenure. Larson would have one subsequent major label affiliation, having two country music-focused albums released by MCA Records in 1985–86.

Samantha Fox version

In 1988, British singer Samantha Fox covered the song as "I Only Wanna Be with You" for her third studio album, I Wanna Have Some Fun (1988).

Fox would recall the song as being the first song she ever learned to sing, the Dusty Springfield original version being among a stack of singles her mother handed down to her when she was 10. The decision to record the song was Fox's, and she was relieved when producers Stock Aitken Waterman agreed to the idea, having worried they would only want to record their own compositions, for publishing reasons.

Released as the follow-up single to the album's title cut, "I Only Wanna Be With You" was promoted with a music video which included scenes of Fox hunting through rubbish bins, dancing, fireworks, and the singer in bed with her bespectacled lover. Fox also promoted the song via televised performances, including those on Top of the Pops in 1989 and Viva el espectáculo on TVE1 in 1990.

"I Only Wanna Be with You" earned Fox her final global hit single to date. In the United States, where "I Wanna Have Some Fun" had been a Top Ten hit, "I Only Wanna Be with You" rose no higher than number 31 and would mark Fox's final Billboard Hot 100 appearance: in Fox's native UK her version outperformed her previous six single releases with a number-16 peak, but would also become her final major hit, bar her 1998 one-off comeback single "Santa Maria".

Critical reception
Robin Smith, reviewer of British music newspaper Record Mirror, was disappointed by Fox's  choice. In his opinion, the British singer made a serious mistake after the  "sheer excellence of "Love House", adding that the decision to use a "tired remake of an old hit" will grant her a "first class ticket back to bimbo land."

Track listings
7-inch single
A. "I Only Wanna Be with You" – 2:45
B. "Confession" – 4:40

12-inch single
A1. "I Only Wanna Be with You" (Extended Mix) – 4:56
A2. "I Only Wanna Be with You" (Acapella Mix) – 3:17
B1. "I Only Wanna Acid with You" (Mix 1) – 6:20
B2. "Confession" – 4:40

European CD single
"I Only Wanna Be with You" – 2:45
"Nothing's Gonna Stop Me Now" – 3:42
"I Only Wanna Be with You" (Extended Version) – 4:56
"Confession" – 4:40

Japanese mini CD single
"I Only Wanna Be with You"
"The Best Is Yet to Come"

Charts

Weekly charts

Year-end charts

Luis Miguel version

Background
Mexican singer Luis Miguel recorded a version of the song, titled "Ahora te puedes marchar" ("Now you can leave") which was released as the first single from his Grammy-nominated album Soy como quiero ser (1987), the first album recorded by the singer under the WEA record label. It was produced by Juan Carlos Calderón and adapted by Luis Gómez Escolar. This single became very successful, peaking at number-one in the Billboard Hot Latin Tracks chart for three non-consecutive weeks in 1987, being the first chart topper for the singer on the chart. At the time, Luis Miguel was the youngest to score a number-one hit on the Hot Latin Tracks at the age of 17, ironically replacing the then 44-year-old veteran Julio Iglesias at the summit. In 2005, Luis Miguel included this song on his compilation album Grandes Éxitos. This version ranked at number 28 in the Hot Latin Tracks Year-End Chart of 1988. The song was translated into Portuguese as "Agora Você Pode Ir" for the Brazilian edition of the album. A version by Spanish pop singer Lita Torrelló, adapted by Julian Mario Suarez Gomez and released in 1964 also shares the same title.

The lyrics are considerably different from the original song, telling the story of a man rejecting a woman interested in reforming a relationship, counter to themes of unconditional love shown in Dusty Springfield's original.

Music videos
Two music videos were shot. The first one was shot with Angélica Rivera, while the second one was shot dancing in a bridge. The second one was included in Grandes Éxitos Videos.

Chart performance

Weekly charts

Year-end charts

Other versions

1964 Les Surfs as "A présent tu peux t'en aller" (France)
 Richard Anthony (France) 
 Claudette Vandal (Canada)
 Les Surfs as "E adesso te ne puoi andar" #2 (Italy)
 Lill-Babs as "Jag Vill Vara Nära Dig" Swedish
 Donna Lynn on her eponymous album Capitol LP 2085
 Lita Torelló (es) as "Ahora te puedes marchar" Spanish
 Silvana Velasco (es) Spanish
 Lucecita as "Un lugar para los dos" Spanish
1965 Enrique Guzmán as "Sólo quiero estar contigo" Spanish on his album Éxitos internacionales
 Juan Ramón (es) on his album Más corazón que nunca
1966 Les Surfs as "Ahora te puedes marchar" Spanish
1967 Helena Vondráčková as "Chytila jsem na pasece motýlka" Czech
1969 Elin as "Det har jeg altid ønsket mig" Danish
 Agneta Zelán as "Jag Ville Vara Nära Dig" Swedish
1975 Chelsia Chan on her debut album Dark Side Of Your Mind
 Rauli 'Badding' Somerjoki as "Jykevää on rakkaus" Finnish on his album Sydän lämpöä täys 
1976 Howard Carpendale as "Ab Heute Weht Ein Neuer Wind" German
 James Fung as "天賜良緣" Cantonese

1982 Barbara Dickson on her album Here We Go...Barbara Dickson Live on Tour
in medley with "Dancing in the Street"/ "He's a Rebel"/ "You Keep Me Hangin' On"
1983 The Flirts on their album 10¢ a Dance
 Tony Hatch & His Orchestra on his album Quiet Nights
1986 Southside Johnny & The Jukes on their album At Least We Got Shoes
 Thea Paluoja & Proov 583 as "Sinu juures" Estonian
1988 Samuel Hui as "Radio好知己"
Cantonese 
1989 Danny Chan on his album Yat sang ho kau 
as "流浪者/ lau long tze" Cantonese
 Onda Choc as Vais pedir-me p'ra namorar European Portuguese
1991 Maywood on their Walking Back to Happiness album
1992 Paula Koivuniemi on her album Se kesäni mun as "Haluun olla luonas sun" Finnish
 Wenche Myhre as "Hvis Bare Jeg Får Bli Hos Deg" Norwegian

1993 Beatriz Rico on her album Baila sin parar as "Ahora te puedes marchar" Spanish
1994 Bridgette Wilson on her same-titled album Japanese
1997 Ash covered the song for a promotional tour
1998 Twiggy & Twiggy on the soundtrack of Dead Man on Campus
 Annette Klingenberg on her album Weep No More
1999 Argema (cs) on their album Milion Snů as "Žába"Czech
Elton John performed the song in concert at the Peoria (IL) Civic Center Arena after learning of Dusty Springfield's death on 2 March 1999. John introduced the song saying "Dusty, wherever you are, this one's for you, my love, with all my love."
Ville Valo with the Agents on the Agents' album Laulava Sydän as "Jykevää on rakkaus" Finnish
2000 René Froger on his album The Passion Tracks 
2001 Me First and the Gimme Gimmes on their album Blow in the Wind
2002 Vonda Shepard on her album Songs from Ally McBeal
2003  on her 2003 album Me & Moment in Time
2004 Tommy February6 on her single "Lovely (Yumemiru Lovely Boy)" 
2005 Taiwanese female group 7 Flowers on their eponymous album 
 Volbeat on their 2005 debut album The Strength / The Sound / The Songs
 Susan Wong on her album These Foolish Things
2007 Tina Arena on her album Songs of Love & Loss
 The Shakers (Uruguayan band) as "Sólo quiero estar contigo" Spanish: 
bonus track on re-issue of band's 1965 album Los Shakers
2008 Shelby Lynne on her Dusty Springfield tribute album Just a Little Lovin'
2009 Jessica Andersson as "I Only Wanna Be With You" on her album Wake Up 
 Barbee (hu) as "Ámor nyila" Hungarian
2011 Amy Macdonald: recorded 2008 for canceled multi-artist Dusty Springfield tribute album: track first released on album Reworked, a multi-artist fundraiser for Save the Children featuring songs used in John Lewis ad campaigns 
2013 Lodovica Comello on her album Universo
2018 Super Junior as "Ahora te puedes marchar" Spanish on their One More Time EP
2019 Emma Bunton on her album My Happy Place as a duet with Will Young
2021 Birdy released a cover as a digital single on 1 December 2021, produced by David Kosten.

Uses on television
 The song was used in the opening for the TV series Arli$$ from seasons 2 through 7 (the program’s last).
 The Tourists' version of the song was played along with TV clips on final week of broadcasting of Thames Television in December 1992 before Carlton Television took over.
 The song was used in the British soap opera EastEnders when the character Sam Mitchell dug up the body of Den Watts.
 The song was used by TVNZ's TV2 to promote their programming from 1997 to mid-2000, with the chorus changing its words to "You only want to be with 2".
 The song was also used as soundtrack in Greek Comedy TV series "Tilempora" (TV Storm) on Mega Channel in 2004.
 The song was used by CBC Television to promote its programming between 1989 and 1991, while the network's slogan was "CBC and You".
 The song featured in a John Lewis television ad highlighting how the company had been selling electronic equipment for a substantial number of years.
 The song was used in a swimwear advert for Boux Avenue in 2014. The ad featured Jamelia, who also sang the song, with the chorus changed to "I only want to be with Boux".
 A television ad campaign for Dogs Trust which launched in February 2016 features Hope Russell-Winter singing "I Only Want to Be With You".
 The song was also featured in an episode of That '70s Show when Fez and Donna were having scenes where they pretended to be dating.
 Me First And The Gimme Gimmes' version of the song was used in an episode of Shameless (USA).
 The song was used in season 5, episode 2 of Ray Donovan as Ray and Abby are driving around on their anniversary.
 Janine sings the song to her baby in the hospital in season 2, episode 8 of The Handmaid's Tale.
 A cover version of the song, played by a saxophonist, serves as the theme tune to ITV sitcom Kate & Koji (2020-2022).

References

External links
 
 

1963 debut singles
1987 singles
1989 singles
Luis Miguel songs
Dusty Springfield songs
Bay City Rollers songs
Song recordings with Wall of Sound arrangements
Nicolette Larson songs
Samantha Fox songs
The Tourists songs
Southside Johnny & The Asbury Jukes songs
Song recordings produced by Jimmy Ienner
Song recordings produced by Stock Aitken Waterman
1963 songs
Song recordings produced by Johnny Franz
Philips Records singles
Jive Records singles
Arista Records singles
Bell Records singles
Ultratop 50 Singles (Flanders) number-one singles
Warner Music Latina singles
Warner Records singles
Songs written by Ivor Raymonde
Songs written by Mike Hawker (songwriter)